Panjal Mastan (Urdu پنجال مستان) is a scenic place in Bagh Valley of Azad-Kashmir.

The Panjal Mastan National Park is in the Bagh District of Azad-Kashmir.
Panjal Mastan National Park is at an average elevation of 2800 metres (9186 feet) above sea level, making the Panjal Mastan Plains one of the highest plateaus in the Bagh.  The park protects an area of 3,00 square kilometres. It is well known for its rich flora and fauna of the Pir Panjal ecoregion.  In spring it is covered by sweeps wildflowers.

Climate and ecology
Panjal Mastan features a subtropical highland climate (Cwb) under the Köppen climate classification.  It is in the outer Pir Panjal, retaining high altitude. This type of area has cold, snowy winters, relatively cool summer with drastically escalated rain, in relation with lower altitudes, and frequent fog. Precipitation is received year round, with two maxima, first one during winter and second one at summer, July–August. Total mean precipitation annually is 1,789 mm (70.4 in).[7] A variety of rare animal species can be found in Panjal Mastan, including the leopard, which inhabits the neighbouring Galiyat region.  More common animals include the rhesus monkey, wild boar, foxes and various species of birds, including the cheer pheasant and kalij pheasant.  The area gives its name to the Panjal vole, a rodent species endemic to Pakistan.

References

National parks of Pakistan
Bagh District
Tourist attractions in Azad Kashmir